Jackie Milburn (1924–1988) was an English footballer who played for Newcastle United and England.

Jackie Milburn or Jack Milburn  may also refer to:
 Jack Milburn (1908–1979), English football player and manager for Leeds United
 Jackie Milburn (1921–2006), footballer who played for Crook Town and Willington